Elizabeth Jane Johnson Robinson (1918 – April 22, 2015) was an American computational linguist who served as president of the Association for Computational Linguistics.

Life
Jane Johnson was born in 1918 near Dallas–Fort Worth, and moved with her mother to Los Angeles in the 1920s. She graduated in 1938 with an A.B. in history from the University of California, Los Angeles, in the same year marrying Edward Charles Robinson, a fellow history student at UCLA. She stayed on at UCLA with a graduate fellowship in history while at the same time beginning to raise a family of four children.

After completing her Ph.D. in 1946, with the dissertation The Early Life of John Lilburne: A Study in Puritan Political Thought concerning John Lilburne, she found that the only academic positions in history open at the time were limited to men. Instead, she worked as an English instructor at UCLA and California State University, Los Angeles, becoming the sole supporter of her family after the death of her husband in the late 1950s. As an English instructor, she began learning about computational linguistics and transformational grammar with the idea that it might help her teach English to engineers.

In the 1950s, she began working with David G. Hays on natural language processing at the RAND Corporation. She moved to IBM Research and the Thomas J. Watson Research Center in the 1960s, and to SRI International in 1973. She served as the president of the Association for Computational Linguistics in 1982, and retired in 1987.

Her personal interests included poetry and backpacking. She died on April 22, 2015.

Research and selected publications
Robsinson's research interests involved the uses of grammars in computational linguistics, including the interplay between formal grammar and the details of the natural languages they are used to describe, transformations between dependency grammar and phrase structure grammar, and grammars for the incorrect use of language.

Her publications included:

References

External links
Jane Robinson, SRI International Artificial Intelligence Center

1918 births
2015 deaths
American computer scientists
American women computer scientists
Computational linguistics researchers
Linguists from the United States
University of California, Los Angeles alumni
University of California, Los Angeles faculty
California State University, Los Angeles faculty
21st-century American women